Russky Sukhoy Izyak (Urıś Qoro İźäge) is a rural locality (a village) in Pokrovsky Selsoviet, Fyodorovsky District, Bashkortostan, Russia. The population was 85 as of 2010. There is 1 street.

Geography 
Russky Sukhoy Izyak is located 21 km northwest of Fyodorovka (the district's administrative centre) by road. Tatarsky Sukhoy Izyak is the nearest rural locality.

References 

Rural localities in Fyodorovsky District